The Dragon Rectangular Coin is a bullion coin produced by the Perth Mint since 2018. Resembling a cross between conventional gold and silver coins and gold and silver bars, the silver coin has a face value of one Australian dollar, while the gold version has a face value of one hundred Australian dollars. Unlike other bullion coins, which are .999 fine silver, both versions are 0.9999 fine, and weigh exactly one troy ounce. A maximum of 250,000 Uncirculated silver coins, and 3,888 Proof maximum mintage are produced each year.

References

Bullion coins of Australia
Gold bullion coins
Silver bullion coins